Pseudonebularia gracilefragum is a species of sea snail, a marine gastropod mollusk in the family Mitridae, the miters or miter snails.

Description

Distribution
Tropical Indo-Pacific (Maldives, Indonesia, Vietnam, Philippines, Okinawa, Papua New Guinea, Solomons, Marquesas Islands). From fairly shallow subtidal water (8-20 m) to deep water (180 m), on bottoms of sand and coral rubble.

References

Mitridae
Gastropods described in 2007